Federal detention centers are pretrial detention facilities within the Bureau of Prisons. As administrative security level facilities, they are capable of holding inmates in all security categories. Thus, typically they have security measures such as double fences, roving patrols, and restricted movement. Agent Steal and others have noted that the conditions in the FDCs are generally better than in local jails.

See also

 Ivan Pravilov (1963–2012), Ukrainian ice hockey coach, arrested for sexual abuse of teenage student, committed suicide by hanging in Philadelphia Federal Detention Center

References

Prisons in the United States